The Little Black Sturgeon River is a river in the Nelson River drainage basin in Kenora District, northwestern Ontario, Canada. It is a tributary of the Black Sturgeon River.

Course
It flows northwest to Beaubien Lake, then south through High Lake and Low Lake, and west to Drewry Lake.

See also
List of rivers of Ontario

References

Rivers of Kenora District